Hermann Gallos (21 January 1886 – 20 February 1957) was an Austrian operatic tenor and academic teacher. He was a long-standing ensemble member of the Vienna State Opera and performed regularly at the Salzburg Festival from 1922 to 1950, in roles such as Pedrillo in Mozart's Die Entführung aus dem Serail and Valzacchi in Der Rosenkavalier by Richard Strauss.

Life and career 
Born in Vienna, Gallos first studied law at the University of Vienna, and then voice at the Vienna Music Academy. He sang predominantly buffo roles and was often heard in important tenor secondary roles. In 1922, the first year in which operas were performed at the Salzburg Festival, he appeared in Mozart operas, as Pedrillo in Die Entführung aus dem Serail and Don Curzio in Le nozze di Figaro, both conducted by Franz Schalk. He appeared at the festival until 1950. He was involved in several new productions after the reconstruction of the Kleines Festspielhaus: in 1927 and 1936 as Jaquino in Beethoven's Fidelio, from 1936 to 1938 as Augustin Moser in Wagner's Die Meistersinger von Nürnberg and often as Valzacchi in Der Rosenkavalier by Richard Strauss, between 1929 and 1946.

Gallos was for decades a member of the Vienna State Opera. He appeared as Scaramuccio in the first performance of the revised version of Ariadne auf Naxos on 4 October 1916, singing 112 performances in the role. He toured with the ensemble to the Paris Opera in 1928.

Gallos also taught at the Vienna Music Academy. He was a teacher of Hans Braun and Walter Berry, among others.

Gallos died in Vienna at age 71. He is buried in the Wiener Zentralfriedhof (group 33F, row 12, number 8).

Discography 
Recordings with Gallos are held by the German National Library, including:
 1933: Der Rosenkavalier (complete recording, Vienna)
 1944: Fidelio (complete recording at Wiener Konzerthaus)
 1950–1951: Die Meistersinger von Nürnberg, conductor: Hans Knappertsbusch
 1954: Salome, conductor: Clemens Krauss (Naxos Historical)

References

External links 

 
 Hermann Gallos Discography on Musixmatch.de
 
 Hermann Gallos on JPC

1886 births
1957 deaths
Musicians from Vienna
Austrian operatic tenors
20th-century Austrian  male opera singers
Voice teachers
University of Vienna alumni
University of Music and Performing Arts Vienna alumni
Academic staff of the University of Music and Performing Arts Vienna